Roelof Jan "Roeffie" Vermeulen (26 February 1906 in Leeuwarden - 28 June 1963, Leeuwarden) was a sailor from the Netherlands, who represented his native country at the 1928 Summer Olympics in Amsterdam. Vermeulen, as crew member on the Dutch 6 Metre Kemphaan, took the 4th place with helmsman Hans Pluijgers and fellow crew members: Hans Fokker, Wim Schouten and Carl Huisken.

Sources

 

1906 births
1963 deaths
Sportspeople from Leeuwarden
Dutch male sailors (sport)

Sailors at the 1928 Summer Olympics – 6 Metre
Olympic sailors of the Netherlands